The 11th Wisconsin Infantry Regiment was an infantry regiment that served in the Union Army during the American Civil War.

Service
The 11th Wisconsin was raised at Madison, Wisconsin, and mustered into Federal service October 18, 1861.

The regiment was mustered out on September 5, 1865, at Mobile, Alabama.

Total enlistments and casualties
The 11th Wisconsin initially mustered 1,045 men and later recruited an additional 622 men, for a total of 1,667 men.
The regiment lost 8 officers and 80 enlisted men killed in action or who later died of their wounds, plus another 4 officers and 253 enlisted men who died of disease, for a total of 280 fatalities.

The Regiment's officers included Lieutenant Angus R. MacDonald, a native of Eigg in Scotland's Inner Hebrides. At the time of his death, Lieut. MacDonald was the last direct descendant of the legendary Scottish Gaelic Bard and Jacobite officer, Alasdair Mac Mhaighstir Alasdair.

Commanders
Colonel Charles L. Harris

See also

 List of Wisconsin Civil War units
 Wisconsin in the American Civil War
Christopher C. Wehner, The 11th Wisconsin in the Civil War: A Regimental History (McFarland, N.C., 2008) https://mcfarlandbooks.com/product/the-11th-wisconsin-in-the-civil-war-2/

References

External links
The Civil War Archive
11th Wisconsin Regiment History

Military units and formations established in 1861
Military units and formations disestablished in 1865
Units and formations of the Union Army from Wisconsin
1861 establishments in Wisconsin